Archibald is a masculine given name, composed of the Germanic elements erchan (with an original meaning of "genuine" or "precious") and bald meaning "bold".

Medieval forms include Old High German  and Anglo-Saxon .
Erkanbald, bishop of Strasbourg (d. 991) was also rendered  in Old French.  There is also a secondary association of its first element with the Greek prefix archi- meaning "chief, master", to Norman England in the high medieval period.

The form Archibald became particularly popular among Scottish nobility in the later medieval to early modern periods, whence usage as a surname is derived by the 18th century, found especially in Scotland and later Nova Scotia.

Given name
English diminutives or hypocorisms include Arch, Archy, Archie, and Baldie (nickname).
Variants include French Archambault, Archaimbaud, Archenbaud, Archimbaud, 
Italian Archimboldo, Arcimbaldo, Arcimboldo, Portuguese  Arquibaldo, Arquimbaldo and Spanish Archibaldo, Archivaldo.
Archibald is used as the anglicization of the (unrelated) Gaelic given name Gille Easbuig (also anglicized as Gillespie).

The given name Archibald was comparatively popular in the United States in the late 19th century, peaking at rank 290 in 1890, but it rapidly fell out of fashion in the early 20th century, falling below rank 1,000 in popularity during the 1920s.

Variations
 - (Amharic)
 - (Arabic)
 - (Belarusian)
 - (Bengali)
 - (Bulgarian)
 - (Simplified Chinese)
 - (Traditional Chinese)
 - (Georgian)
 - (Gujarati)
 - (Hebrew)
 - (Hindi)
 - (Japanese)
 - (Kannada)
 - (Kazakh)
 - (Korean)
 - (Kyrgyz)
 - (Latin)
 - (Lithuanian)
 - (Malayalam)
 - (Marathi)
 - (Mongolian)
 - (Nepali)
 - (Pashto)
 - (Persian)
 - (Punjabi)
 - (Russian)
 - (Serbian)
 (Sindhi)
 - (Sinhala)
 - (Tamil)
 - (Telugu)
 - (Ukrainian)
 - (Urdu)

People with given name

Medieval
 Archibald I, Lord of Douglas (ca. 1198–1238)
 Archibald (bishop of Moray) (died 1298)
 Archibald Douglas, 3rd Earl of Douglas (1325–1400), Lord of Galloway
 Sir Archibald Douglas (died 1333), Guardian of Scotland
 Archibald Douglas, 4th Earl of Douglas (1370–1424), also Duke of Touraine
 Archibald Douglas, 5th Earl of Douglas (1390–1439)
 Archibald Douglas, Earl of Moray (1426–1455)
 Archibald Douglas, 5th Earl of Angus (1453–1514), Scottish politician and magnate

Early modern
In the late medieval and early modern period, the given name Archibald became popular among Scottish aristocracy in particular. See Archibald Campbell (disambiguation), Archibald Douglas (disambiguation), Archibald Hamilton (disambiguation), Archibald Montgomerie (disambiguation), Archibald Napier (disambiguation), Archibald Primrose (disambiguation) for lists of individuals with these names.

Archibald Douglas of Kilspindie (1475–1536)
Archibald Douglas, 6th Earl of Angus (1490–1557) 
 Archibald Campbell, 2nd Earl of Argyll (died 1513), Lord Chancellor of Scotland
 Archibald Campbell, 4th Earl of Argyll (c. 1507–1558), Scottish nobleman and politician
 Archibald Campbell, 5th Earl of Argyll (1532/7–1573), Scottish politician
Sir Archibald Napier (1534–1608), Scottish landowner and official, master of the Scottish mint and Laird of Merchiston
Archibald Douglas, 8th Earl of Angus (1556–1588) (also 5th Earl of Morton)
 Archibald Campbell, 7th Earl of Argyll (c. 1575–1638), Scottish politician and military leader
Archibald Campbell, 1st Marquess of Argyll (1607–1661)
Archibald Douglas, 1st Earl of Ormond (1609–1655)
 Archibald Primrose, Lord Carrington (1616–1679),  Scottish lawyer, judge, and cavalier
 Lord Archibald Hamilton (1673–1754), Scottish politician
Archibald Cameron of Locheil (1707–1753),  leader in the Jacobite uprising 
 Archibald Montgomerie, 11th Earl of Eglinton (1726–1796), Scottish general, and Member of Parliament (MP)
 Archibald Douglas-Hamilton, 9th Duke of Hamilton (1740–1819), Scottish peer and politician
Archibald McBryde (1766–1816), Scottish born US Congressman
 Lord Archibald Hamilton (1769–1827), son of the above, MP for Lanarkshire.
Archibald Murphey (1777–1832), North Carolina politician

Modern
Archibald Butt (1865-1912), American journalist, United States Army officer, presidential adviser and Titanic sinking victim
Archibald Cecil Chappelow (1886–1976), British fine art consultant
Archibald Hamilton (1790–1815), officer in the United States Navy
Archibald McLean (judge) (1791–1865), Upper Canadian judge
John Archibald Campbell (1811–1889), American lawyer
Archibald McLelan (1824–1890), colonial Nova Scotian shipbuilder and politician
Sir Archibald Geikie (1835 - 1924), Scottish geologist
Archibald Primrose, 5th Earl of Rosebery (1847–1929), Prime Minister of the United Kingdom during 1894/5
Archibald Grimké (1849–1930), American intellectual, journalist, and diplomat
Archibald Gracie IV (1859–1912), American writer and RMS Titanic sinking survivor
Archibald Keightley (1859–1930), theosophist
Archibald Lampman (1861–1899), Canadian poet
Archibald Ritchie (British Army officer) (1869–1955), British Army Major-General of World War I
Archibald Boyd-Carpenter (1873–1937), British politician
Archibald Wavell, 1st Earl Wavell (1883–1950), commander in the British Army
Archibald Hill (1886–1977), British physiologist
Archibald MacLeish (1892–1982), American modernist writer
Archibald Roosevelt (1894–1979), American soldier
Archibald F. Bennett (1896–1965)  LDS genealogist
Archibald Joseph Cronin (1896–1981),   Scottish author
Admiral Sir Archibald Dickson, 1st Baronet (died 1803), Royal Navy officer
Archibald Alexander Leach (1904–1986, stage name Cary Grant), American actor
John Archibald Wheeler (1911–2008), American theoretical physicist
Archibald Cox  (1912–2004), U.S. Solicitor General
Archibald Hall (1924–2002), Scottish serial killer
Archibald Gemmill (b. 1947) Scottish Football Player (Hero of Mendoza, Argentina 1978)
Archie Manning (b. 1949), former National Football League player and father of Peyton Manning and Eli Manning
Archie Thompson, (b. 1978), Australian footballer
Archibald Wickeramaraja Singham (1932-1991), Sri Lankan Tamil political scientist and historian
Archie Mountbatten-Windsor, (b. 2019), British Royal, son of Prince Harry, Duke of Sussex and Meghan, Duchess of Sussex
Archibald W. O. Totten (1809–1867), Justice of the Tennessee Supreme Court
Archibald Boyce Monwabisi Mafeje (1936–2007), commonly known as Archie Mafeje, was a South African anthropologist and activist

People with the mononym or pseudonym
Archibald (musician), stage name of Leon Gross (1916–1973), American R&B musician
 Archibald Peck, 2011 ring name of Robert Evans (wrestler) (b. 1983)
 Archibald, a pseudonym of Waldemar Łysiak

Fictional characters with the given name
Archie Andrews (comics), the namesake character from Archie Comics
Archibald Asparagus, a character from the Christian video series, VeggieTales
Archie Bunker, a character in the sitcom All in the Family
Archibald Craven, uncle and adoptive father of the protagonist, Mary Lennox, in The Secret Garden.
Archie Chapman, guy from the Verdicts.
Archie Goodwin, a character in Rex Stout's mysteries.
 Archibald Grosvenor, a character in the Gilbert and Sullivan opera Patience
Captain Haddock, a character in Hergé's The Adventures of Tintin.
Archibald the Koala, animated children's television series
 Archibald "Archie" Mitchell, a character from the television soap opera EastEnders
 Arcimboldo, a DC Comics character
 Archie, a character played by Mark Strong in Guy's Ritchie movie Rock'N'Rolla
 Archie Wong, a character on Waterloo Road played by Christopher Chung.
 Archibald Archibaldovich, pirate and maitre d'hotel Griboyedev, minor comic character in The Master and Margarita
 Archibald Witwicky, the character from Transformers who discovered Megatron in his National Arctic Circle Expedition
 Archibald MacGregor, a supporting character seen in a few mission in the well-known game by Rockstar Games, Red Dead Redemption II.
 Archibald Yronwood, a minor character in George R. R. Martin's A Song of Ice and Fire fantasy series

Surname
Archibald is a modern Anglo-Saxon surname, derived from the given name.

In Renaissance Italy
Arcimboldo or Arcimboldi was used as a surname in Renaissance Italy--see Arcimboldi

In Nova Scotia, Canada 
It becomes frequent in Nova Scotia by the later 18th century. Early bearers of the name associated with Nova Scotia include:

David Archibald (politician) (1717–1795), represented Truro Township
Samuel Archibald (politician, born 1742)  (1742–1780), son of David Archibald
Samuel George William Archibald (1777–1846), politician, son of Samuel Archibald
Charles Dickson Archibald (1802–1868), Truro businessman, son of Samuel George William Archibald
Sir Edward Mortimer Archibald (1810–1884), diplomat, son of Samuel George
Edith Archibald (1854–1936), suffragist and author, daughter of Sir Edward Mortimer
Matthew Archibald (1745–1820), politician, son of Samuel
Alexander Lackie Archibald (1788–1859), politician son of Matthew Archibald
Thomas Dickson Archibald (1813 – 1890), Onslow, Nova Scotia-native, politician
Adams George Archibald (1814 – 1892), Truro, Nova Scotia-native, politician
Cyril Archibald (1837–1914), South Stormont, Ontario-native, politician 
Donald Archibald (1840–1908), Musquodoboit, Nova Scotia-native, politician
Raymond Clare Archibald (1875–1955), Nova Scotia-native, Canadian-American mathematician and historian of mathematics
Edgar Archibald (1885–1968), Yarmouth, Nova Scotia-native, agricultural scientist
George W. Archibald (b. 1946), New Glasgow, Nova Scotia-native, American ornithologist

In other places
The surname becomes more widespread in the English-speaking world in general during the 19th century:

Canada
Edward Archibald (athlete) (1884–1965), Canadian pole vaulter
Frank C. Archibald (Newfoundland politician) (1887–1972), Harbour Grace, Newfoundland native, politician
Harry Archibald (1910–1965), Wynot, Saskatchewan native, politician
Nancy Archibald (1911–1996), Montreal native, fencer 
Joan Archibald (1913–2002), Montreal native, fencer
Josh Archibald (b. 1992), Regina, Saskatchewan native, ice hockey player
Jim Archibald (b. 1961), Craik, Saskatchewan native, ice hockey player
Dave Archibald (b. 1969), Chilliwack, British Columbia native, ice hockey player

United States
Ben Archibald (b. 1978), American player of gridiron football
George D. Archibald (1820– ?), Washington County, Pennsylvania-native, theologian
James Archibald (1912–2006), Houlton, Maine native, judge 
Joey Archibald (1914–1998), Providence, Rhode Island-native, boxer
Lynn Archibald (1944–1997), American college basketball head coach
Nate Archibald (b. 1948), South Bronx native, basketball player
Nolan D. Archibald (b.1943), CEO of Black and Decker
 Robin Tenney Archibald (born 1958), American tennis player

Australia
 Frank Archibald (died 1975), Aboriginal Australian elder in whose honour the Frank Archibald Memorial Lecture Series was named
Jules François Archibald (1856–1919), Australian journalist and publisher
William Archibald (politician) (1850–1926), South Australian politician

New Zealand
 Anna Archibald (b. 1959), alpine skier and Olympian
 Jeff Archibald (b. 1952), Auckland native, field hockey player

United Kingdom
In the UK, Archibald is mostly found as a Scottish surname.

Adam Archibald (1879–1957), Leith native, Victoria Cross recipient
Adrian Archibald (b. 1969), Ballymoney native, motorcycle racer
Alan Archibald (b. 1977), Glasgow native, football player
Bobby Archibald (1894–1966), Strathaven, South Lanarkshire native, association footballer
George Archibald, 1st Baron Archibald (1898–1975), British politician
George Christopher Archibald (1926–1996), British economist, son of Baron Archibald
Jimmy Archibald (1892–1975), Falkirk native, association footballer
Jordan Archibald (1897–1946), Glasgow native, British Wrestling Champion 2012-2013
Joseph Archibald (died 2014), Saint Kittitian-born British Virgin Islands lawyer and judge
Liliana Leah Archibald (1928–2014), English insurance broker
Marion Archibald (1936–2016), Scottish numismatist
Nicholas Archibald (b. 1975), Scottish cricketer 
Phyllis Archibald (1880–1947), English sculptor
Robert Archibald (1980–2020), Paisley, Renfrewshire native, basketball player
Sandy Archibald (1897–1946), Aberdour native, association footballer
Steve Archibald (b. 1956), Glasgow native, association footballer and manager

Fictional characters with the surname
Nate Archibald (Gossip Girl), a main character on the TV series Gossip Girl
Kayneth El-Melloi Archibald, a character in Fate/Zero

See also

References

English masculine given names